Constitution of 1947 may refer to:

1947 Chinese Constitution
1947 Constitution of New Jersey
Small Constitution of 1947, temporary constitution of Poland
Constitution of Italy, passed in 1947
Showa Constitution, the current Japanese Constitution that was enacted in 1947.